Álex Corretja defeated Thomas Enqvist in the final, 6–4, 6–4, 6–3 to win the men's singles tennis title at the 2000 Indian Wells Masters.

Mark Philippoussis was the defending champion, but lost in the semifinals to Enqvist.

Seeds

  Andre Agassi (first round)
  Pete Sampras (quarterfinals)
  Yevgeny Kafelnikov (second round)
  Nicolas Kiefer (first round)
  Gustavo Kuerten (second round)
  Magnus Norman (quarterfinals)
  Marcelo Ríos (second round)
  Nicolás Lapentti (semifinals)
  Cédric Pioline (first round)
  Thomas Enqvist (final)
  Tim Henman (second round)
  Mark Philippoussis (semifinals)
  Patrick Rafter (second round)
  Álbert Costa (third round)
  Greg Rusedski (second round)
  Lleyton Hewitt (second round)

Draw

Finals

Top half

Section 1

Section 2

Bottom half

Section 3

Section 4

References

External links
 Official results archive (ATP)
 Official results archive (ITF)

Indian Wells Masters
Singles men